Rana Muhammad Tariq (Urdu/; born 10 September 1960) is a Pakistani politician who had been a member of the Provincial Assembly of the Punjab from August 2018 till January 2023. He is affiliated with the Pakistan Muslim League (N) (PML-N) and represents Constituency PP-171 (Lahore-XXVIII).

Early life
Rana Muhammad Tariq was born on 10 September 1960 to Rana Shabbir Ahmad. He is a resident of Gulberg, Lahore.

Political career 

He was elected to the Provincial Assembly of the Punjab as a candidate of Pakistan Muslim League (N) from Constituency PP-171 (Lahore-XXVIII) in 2018 Pakistani general election. A retired army colonel, Tariq was previously a member of the Pakistan Peoples Party before joining the PML-N in 2013.

References 

Living people
Pakistan Muslim League (N) MPAs (Punjab)
Pakistan People's Party politicians
Pakistan Army officers
Punjab MPAs 2018–2023
1960 births